Janaki Ballabh Patnaik (3 January 1927 – 21 April 2015) was an Indian politician who had been Governor of Assam from 2009 to 2014. A leader of the Indian National Congress, he was Chief Minister of Odisha from 1980 to 1989 and again from 1995 to 1999, holding that post for the longest time on record before Naveen Patnaik.

After the completion of his early education at Khurda High School, he passed his B.A. degree in Sanskrit from the Utkal University in 1947 and passed his M.A. degree in political science from the Banaras Hindu University in 1949. In 1950, he became the President of the Odisha state unit of the youth wing of the Congress. In 1980, he became the Union Minister for Tourism, Civil Aviation and Labour. The construction of New Jagannath Sadak (Chandanpur of Puri district to Sarankul of Nayagarh district) is one of his major contributions to the transportation and tourism of Odisha.

Controversy 

He was involved in the Anjana Mishra rape case.

Death

He died on Tuesday, 21 April 2015, aged 88 at Tirupati in Andhra Pradesh. On Monday, 20 April 2015, he had gone to attend the convocation of Rashtriya Sanskrit Vidyapeetha, of which he was chancellor, and also visited the Lord Venkateswara Temple, Tirumala. Later in the night, he complained of severe chest pain and was subsequently shifted to Sri Venkateswara Institute of Medical Sciences (SVIMS) where he died at around 3:00 am. on 21 April. He leaves behind a legacy of having translated the Mahabharata, the Ramayana and the Bhagavad Gita into his mother tongue, as he was a Sanskrit-Odia scholar.

References

External links

 The Indian Express on Patnaik's marginalisation
Q & A : J.B. Patnaik The Hindu
Assam Governor JB Patnaik passes away in Tirupati Indian Express
Farewell to JB Patnaik

1927 births
2015 deaths
Chief Ministers of Odisha
Indian National Congress politicians
Utkal University alumni
Leaders of the Opposition in Odisha
Chief ministers from Indian National Congress
Governors of Assam
India MPs 1967–1970
India MPs 1971–1977
India MPs 1980–1984
People from Tirupati
Lok Sabha members from Odisha
Civil aviation ministers of India
Labour ministers of India
Members of the Cabinet of India
Recipients of the Sahitya Akademi Prize for Translation
Recipients of the Odisha Sahitya Akademi Award
Indian National Congress politicians from Odisha